The Poggendorff illusion is a geometrical-optical illusion that involves the misperception of the position of one segment of a transverse line that has been interrupted by the contour of an intervening structure. It is named after Johann Christian Poggendorff, the editor of the journal, who discovered it in the figures Johann Karl Friedrich Zöllner submitted when first reporting on what is now known as the Zöllner illusion, in 1860. The magnitude of the illusion depends on the properties of the obscuring pattern and the nature of its borders.

Many detailed studies of the illusion, including "amputating" various components point to its principal cause: acute angles in the figure are seen by viewers as expanded though the illusion diminishes or disappears when the transverse line is horizontal or vertical. Other factors are involved.

References

Optical illusions